The 2009 South American Footballer of the Year, given to the best football player in South America by Uruguayan newspaper El País through voting by journalists across the continent, was awarded to Juan Sebastián Verón of Estudiantes de La Plata on December 31, 2009.

Verón became the first player since Carlos Tevez in 2004 (and later in 2005) to repeat the award.

Rankings

Notes
1.Édison Méndez played for Dutch club PSV during the first half of 2009.

References

External links

2009
Footballer Of The Year, 2009